The Auckland Region is the most populous region of New Zealand, containing the country's most populous city, Auckland, as well the towns of Wellsford, Warkworth, Helensville, the Hibiscus Coast, Pukekohe and Waiuku and their surrounding rural areas, plus many islands in the Hauraki Gulf including Waiheke Island and Great Barrier Island. It contains a few small rural primary schools, some small town primary and secondary schools, and a large number of city schools. As of June 2011, there are 538 primary and secondary schools in Auckland, enrolling over 267,000 students.

In New Zealand schools, students begin formal education in Year 1 at the age of five. Year 13 is the traditional final year of secondary education, although students are entitled to stay in secondary school until the end of the calendar year of their 19th birthday if need be. The list of schools below is broken up into primary and intermediate schools, which includes contributing primary schools (Years 1–6), full primary schools (Years 1–8), and intermediate schools (Years 7 and 8); secondary schools, which includes normal secondary schools (Years 9-13), secondary schools with intermediate (Years 7–13), junior secondary schools (Years 7–10) and senior secondary schools (Years 11–13); composite schools (Years 1–13); and special schools and teen parent units. Primary and intermediate schools are further broken up into the local board of the Auckland Council in which each school is located.

State schools are those fully funded by the government and at which no fees for tuition of domestic students (i.e. New Zealand citizens and permanent residents, and Australian citizens) can be charged, although a donation is commonly requested. A state integrated school is a former private school with a special character based on a religious or philosophical belief that has been integrated into the state system. State integrated schools charge "attendance dues" to cover the building and maintenance of school buildings, which are not owned by the government, but otherwise they like state schools cannot charge fees for tuition of domestic students but may request a donation. Private schools charge fees to its students for tuition, as do state and state integrated schools for tuition of international students.

The socioeconomic decile indicates the socioeconomic status of the school's catchment area. A decile of 1 indicates the school draws from a poor area; a decile of 10 indicates the school draws from a well-off area. The decile ratings used here come from the Ministry of Education Te Kete Ipurangi website and from the decile change spreadsheet listed in the references. The deciles were last revised using information from the 2006 census. The roll of each school changes frequently as students start school for the first time, move between schools, and graduate. The rolls given here are those provided by the Ministry of Education, and are based on figures from  The Ministry of Education institution number links to the Education Counts page for each school.

Primary and intermediate schools
Unless otherwise stated, all primary and intermediate schools in the Auckland region are coeducational.

Rodney

Hibiscus and Bays

Upper Harbour

Kaipatiki

Devonport–Takapuna

Henderson–Massey

Waitākere Ranges

Great Barrier

Waiheke

Waitemata
The Waitemata local board is the central-most Auckland board, covering the Auckland central business district and several adjacent suburbs, including Freemans Bay, Grey Lynn, Grafton, Herne Bay, Newmarket, Newton, Parnell, Ponsonby and Westmere.

Whau

Albert–Eden

Puketapapa

Ōrākei

Maungakiekie–Tamaki
The Maungakiekie–Tamaki local board covers the south-eastern part of the Auckland isthmus. Major suburbs include Glen Innes, Mount Wellington, Onehunga, Panmure, Penrose, Point England, and parts of Royal Oak.

Howick

Māngere–Ōtāhuhu

Otara–Papatoetoe

Manurewa

Papakura

Franklin

Secondary schools

Composite schools

Special schools and teen parent units

Closed schools

Kelston High School – opened 1954, became Kelston Girls High School (later College) in 1963 after Kelston Boys' High School opened
Westlake High School – opened 1958, became Westlake Girls High School in 1962 after Westlake Boys High School opened.

References

External links
Te Kete Ipurangi Ministry of Education website
ERO school and early childhood education reports Education Review Office
Decile change 2007 to 2008 for state & state integrated schools
Which School in Auckland Which School in Auckland

 
Auckland